{{DISPLAYTITLE:C26H25ClN2O3}}
The molecular formula C26H25ClN2O3 (molar mass: 448.941 g/mol) may refer to:

 Lirequinil (Ro41-3696)
 Tolvaptan

Molecular formulas